Clay Harvison (born September 25, 1980) is an American mixed martial artist who competes in the lightweight division.  A professional competitor since 2006, Harvison has competed for the UFC, Bellator, and was a competitor on The Ultimate Fighter: Team Lesnar vs. Team dos Santos.

Background
Harvison earned his associate degree in finance from Tallahassee Community College. He was enrolled at Kennesaw State for a year when he took a kickboxing class with a friend. Loving the adrenaline rush, Harvison took up Muay Thai and Jiu-Jitsu full-time in hopes of becoming a professional mixed martial artist. He started at KnuckleUp Fitness with Muay Thai coach Mateo Cutbill as his first trainer.

Mixed martial arts career

The Ultimate Fighter
In 2011, Harvison had signed with the UFC to compete in The Ultimate Fighter: Team Lesnar vs. Team dos Santos.

Harvison was picked fourth on Team Lesnar and seventh overall. In the fifth preliminary match-up, Harvison's first fight on the show, he fought Englishman Mick Bowman. Harvison controlled the fight using effective striking, and showing good take down defense. Harvison won the fight via unanimous decision, and was set to go into the quarterfinal round. After the fight was over it was discovered while trying to block a high kick from Bowman, it was believed that Harvison suffered a compound fracture in his pinky finger with the bone protruding from the skin. However, an X-ray later revealed the injury to only be a dislocation rather than a fracture.

Harvison faced Ramsey Nijem in his quarterfinal match. Harvison lost to Nijem via submission due to a rear-naked choke in the first round.

Ultimate Fighting Championship
Even though he lost to Ramsey in the quarterfinals, Harvison remained signed after the show. He made his official UFC debut June 4, 2011 on The Ultimate Fighter 13 Finale card, fighting against fellow castmate Justin Edwards.  He won the fight via split decision.

Harvison moved from Georgia to Utah to train with his Ultimate Fighter castmate, Ramsey Nijem, at the Riven Academy. Harvison was expected to face The Ultimate Fighter: United States vs. United Kingdom runner-up, DaMarques Johnson, on September 17, 2011, at UFC Fight Night 25.  However, Johnson was forced out of the bout with an injury and replaced by Seth Baczynski. He was defeated by rear naked choke submission in the second round.

Harvison was scheduled again to fight DaMarques Johnson. The bout took place on November 12, 2011, at UFC on Fox 1. Harvison lost the bout via first-round KO. After the loss to Johnson, Harvison was released from the promotion.

Bellator MMA
Harvison made his Bellator debut on February 7, 2013, when he faced Ururahy Rodrigues at Bellator 88. He won the fight via TKO (knee) in the third round.

Mixed martial arts record

|-
|Loss
|align=center|14-9
|Jonathan Cobb
|TKO (punches) 
|NFC 121
|
|align=center|1
|align=center|4:21
|Kennesaw, Georgia, United States
|
|-
|Win
|align=center|14-8
|Mike Barnett
|Decision (unanimous)
|LFA 71
|
|align=center|3
|align=center|5:00
|Atlanta, Georgia, United States
|Catchweight (157 lbs) bout.
|-
|Loss
|align=center|13–7
|Yemi Oduwole
|Decision (unanimous)
|NFC 114
|
|align=center|3
|align=center|5:00
|Kennesaw, Georgia, United States
|Welterweight bout.
|-
|Loss
|align=center|13–7
|Brandon Longano
|Submission 
|NFC 96
|
|align=center|2
|align=center|1:05
|Kennesaw, Georgia, United States
|
|-
|Loss
|align=center|13–6
|Jordan Rinaldi
|Submission (rear-naked choke)
|Legacy FC 47
|
|align=center|2
|align=center|4:31
|Atlanta, Georgia, United States
|
|-
|Win
|align=center|13–5
|Joe Elmore
|Decision (unanimous)
|Legacy FC 40
|
|align=center|3
|align=center|5:00
|Duluth, Georgia, United States
|
|-
|Win
|align=center|12–5
|David Lindsey
|TKO (punches)
|Wild Bill's Fight Night 62
|
|align=center|3
|align=center|0:57
|Duluth, Georgia, United States
|
|-
|Win
|align=center|11–5
|Ran Weathers
|Decision (unanimous)
|Wild Bill's Fight Night 58
|
|align=center|3
|align=center|5:00
|Duluth, Georgia, United States
|Lightweight debut.
|-
|Win
|align=center|10–5
|Ururahy Rodrigues
|TKO (knee)
|Bellator 88
|
|align=center|3
|align=center|3:34
|Duluth, Georgia, United States
|Catchweight (160 lbs) bout.
|-
|Loss
|align=center|9–5
|Ronnie Rogers
|Decision (split)
|Wild Bill's Fight Night 49
|
|align=center| 3
|align=center| 5:00
|Duluth, Georgia, United States 
|
|-
|Loss
|align=center|9–4
|DaMarques Johnson
|KO (punches)
|UFC on Fox: Velasquez vs. Dos Santos
|
|align=center| 1
|align=center| 1:34
|Anaheim, California, United States 
|
|-
|Loss
|align=center|9–3
|Seth Baczynski
|Submission (rear-naked choke)
|UFC Fight Night: Shields vs. Ellenberger
|
|align=center|2
|align=center|1:12
|New Orleans, Louisiana, United States
|
|-
|Win
|align=center|9–2
|Justin Edwards
|Decision (split)
|The Ultimate Fighter 13 Finale
|
|align=center|3
|align=center|5:00
|Las Vegas, Nevada, United States
|
|-
|Win
|align=center|8–2
|Aric Nelson
|TKO (punches)  
|Wild Bill's Fight Night 28 
|
|align=center|1
|align=center|0:51
|Duluth, Georgia, United States
|
|-
|Win
|align=center|7–2
|Travis Adams
|TKO (punches)
|Clash of the Kings 
|
|align=center|1
|align=center|3:15
|Kennesaw, Georgia, United States
|
|-
|Loss
|align=center|6–2
|Matt Traylor
|TKO (punches)  
|KoKings
|
|align=center|1
|align=center|2:08
|Atlanta, Georgia, United States
|
|-
|Win
|align=center|6–1
|Shawn Snow
|Submission (armbar) 
|Fight Party: Revenge 
|
|align=center|1
|align=center|4:30
|Duluth, Georgia, United States
|
|-
|Win
|align=center|5–1
|Sean Dyer 
|TKO (punches) 
|Bullet Fight Gear: Last Man Standing
|
|align=center|1
|align=center|3:01
|Kennesaw, Georgia, United States
|
|-
|Win
|align=center|4–1
|Blake Bowman
|Submission
|ISCF: Gladiator X
|
|align=center|1
|align=center|3:01
|Atlanta, Georgia, United States
|
|-
|Loss
|align=center|3–1
|Jeremy Germenis 
|Submission (rear-naked choke) 
|Bullet Fight Gear: Showdown 
|
|align=center|2
|align=center|1:17
|Kennesaw, Georgia, United States
|
|-
|Win
|align=center|3–0
|Josh Rutgers
|Submission (punches)
|Wild Bill's Fight Night 13
|
|align=center|1
|align=center|1:37
|Atlanta, Georgia, United States
|
|-
|Win
|align=center|2–0
|Will Baggett 
|TKO (punches)
|ISCF: Head-On Collision
|
|align=center|2
|align=center|1:55
|Kennesaw, Georgia, United States
|
|-
|Win
|align=center|1–0
|Joshua Fountain	
|Submission
|Wild Bill's Fight Night 6
|
|align=center|1
|align=center|3:43
|Georgia, United States
|

References

External links

Official UFC Profile

American male mixed martial artists
Mixed martial artists utilizing Muay Thai
Mixed martial artists utilizing Brazilian jiu-jitsu
Living people
1980 births
Sportspeople from Marietta, Georgia
Ultimate Fighting Championship male fighters
American Muay Thai practitioners
American practitioners of Brazilian jiu-jitsu